"Back in the U.K." is a song by German group Scooter. It was released in November 1995 as the lead single from their 1996 album Our Happy Hardcore. In the United Kingdom it became their biggest hit ever up to that point, entering at number 18 in the UK Singles Chart in February 1996. It would remain their highest charting single until the release of "The Logical Song" in 2002, which reached number 2. The song was re-recorded as "Back in Ireland" for the Irish market.

Samples
 "Back in the U.K." samples the theme tune of the British film series Miss Marple, originally composed by Ron Goodwin.
 A remixed version of "Crank it Up" is used in the Da Ali G Show as Brüno's (played by Sacha Baron Cohen) intro song.

Critical reception
Pan-European magazine Music & Media wrote, "These three Anglophile ravers from Hamburg have a taste for fast and loud techno. Their driving sound and catchy melodies nail down the listener like an out of control steamroller." Music Week rated the song three out of five, adding, "A riff that sounds like You Are My Sunshine and rabble rousing singing gives this German four-piece's latest track some personality. Otherwise, it's the sort of frantic technopop that gets lapped up on the Continent but engenders a lukewarm response in the UK."

Track listings

Original version
CD maxi – Germany (CLU 6195-5)
 "Back in the U.K." (Long version) (5:24)
 "Back in the U.K." (Radio Version) (3:25)
 "Unity Without Words Part II" (6:28)
 "Crank It Up" (4:08)

CD maxi – Back in Ireland (CLU 6220-5)
 "Back in Ireland" (Long version) (5:24)
 "Back in Ireland" (Radio Version) (3:25)
 "Unity Without Words Part II" (6:28)
 "Crank It Up" (4:08)

12-inch maxi – Germany
 "Back in the U.K." (Long version) (5:24)
 "Unity Without Words Part II" (5:28)
 "Crank It Up" (4:08)

Cassette single - Germany
 "Back in the U.K." (Radio version) (3:24)
 "Crank It Up" (4:08)

CD maxi – Australia
 "Back in the U.K." (Long version) (5:24)
 "Back in the U.K." (Radio Version) (3:25)
 "Unity Without Words Part II" (5:28)
 "Crank It Up" (4:08)
 "Back in the U.K." (Tom Wilson Remix) (5:49)
 "Back in the Kellys Mix" (Paddy Frazer mix) (6:44)

CD single – France
 "Back in the U.K." (Radio Version) (3:25)
 "Back in the U.K." (Long version) (5:24)

Remixes
CD maxi – Germany (CLU 6222-5)
 "Back in the U.K." (Tom Wilson Remix) (5:49)
 "Back in Villabajo" (5:58)
 "Back in the U.K." (Double M's Bassss Mix) (7:13)
 "Back in the Kellys Mix" (Paddy Frazer Mix) (6:44)
 "Back in the U.K." (Double M's Bassss Dub Mix) (7:13)

CD maxi – France
 "Back in the U.K." (Tom Wilson Remix) (5:49)
 "Back in the Kellys Mix" (Paddy Frazer Mix) (6:44)
 "Back in the U.K." (Double M's Bassss Dub Mix) (7:13)

12-inch maxi – Germany
 "Back in the U.K." (Tom Wilson Remix) (5:49)
 "Back in Villabajo" (5:58)
 "Back in the Kellys Mix" (Paddy Frazer Mix) (6:44)
 "Back in the U.K." (Double M's Bassss Dub Mix) (7:13)

Charts and certifications

Weekly charts

Year-end charts

Certifications

References

1995 singles
Scooter (band) songs